Lower Farm Estate is a suburb of Bloxwich, in the Metropolitan Borough of Walsall, West Midlands, England.

There are two multi-storey blocks of council flats on Lower Farm, Smith House and Thomas House on Stoney Lane, both of which were built during the 1960s.

The estate is served by the National Express West Midlands and Diamond Bus 32 bus route.

Lower Farm
During development of the estate in 1963, several agricultural buildings were demolished, including the Lower Farm farmhouse after which the estate was named. It was believed that the farmhouse dated from the early Nineteenth Century, but demolition of the brick and rubble exterior revealed a Late Medieval hall of cruck-truss construction. Photographs and drawings were made but demolition completed. The site of the farmhouse is now occupied by Thomas House.

References

Further reading

Walsall